Leptopus, the maidenbushes, are a genus of plants in the family Phyllanthaceae native to southern Asia from the Caucasus east to China and Maluku. The plants are monoecious herbs and shrubs with simple, entire leaves and small, green flowers. 

Leptopus is one of eight genera in the tribe Poranthereae and comprises 9 species. It is the sister of Actephila. The type species is Leptopus cordifolius.  The name is derived from two Greek words, leptos, "thin, slender, or small", and pous, "foot", a reference to slender pedicels. The genus was first described in 1836 and revised in 2009.

Leptopus fangdingianus had been placed by some authors in a separate genus, Archileptopus, but it was shown in 2007 that recognition of Archileptopus makes Leptopus paraphyletic.  Phyllanthopsis phyllanthoides has been placed in Leptopus as well as in Andrachne. In 2007, it was shown to not properly belong to either genus and in 2008 was assigned to a new genus, Phyllanthopsis.

Species

formerly included
moved to other genera: Chorisandrachne Euphorbia Notoleptopus Phyllanthopsis

References

External links 
 Leptopus At:
 Index Nominum Genericorum At:
 References At:
 NMNH Department of Botany

Phyllanthaceae
Phyllanthaceae genera
Taxa named by Joseph Decaisne